The French tailless Pottier P.40 was the first aircraft designed by Jean Pottier. It flew in 1975.

Design

The Pottier P.40 was the first of Jean Pottier's many designs, begun around 1967, though not the first to fly as the P.70 flew in  August 1974. Construction of the P.40 by Bela Nogrady was started in 1968 but the first flight was not made until 1975.

The P.40 is a tailless aircraft with a swept, cantilever, low wing. In plan, the wing has a rectangular centre section and straight tapered outer panels with elevons. There are wing tip fins and outward opening rudders which extend a little below the wing.

The short fuselage is flat sided, mostly occupied by a long canopy over the single seat cockpit.  The engine, a  Volkswagen 1.2 litre air-cooled flat-four, is in the rear in pusher configuration.  The P.40 has a low, fixed, faired bicycle undercarriage.

Operational history

The first P.40 made only one short flight and was then destroyed. The history of the one surviving example, OO-68, on display in the Belgian Royal Museum of the Armed Forces and Military History in Brussels is obscure. The two machines differed a little, with varying engine cooling and exhaust arrangements, and OO-68 has a three, rather than two, blade propeller.

Specifications

References

Homebuilt aircraft
Single-engined pusher aircraft
Tailless aircraft
1970s French sport aircraft
P.040
Aircraft first flown in 1975